Ali Zaidi may refer to:

 Ali Zaidi (lawyer), American lawyer and policy advisor
Ali Zaidi (politician), a Pakistani politician
 Ali Jawad Zaidi (1916-2004), an Indian poet, scholar and author
 Ali Mabrouk El Zaidi (born 1978), a Libyan long-distance runner
 Syed Ali Ausat Zaidi (1932-2008), an Urdu Soazkhawan
 Safi Lakhnavi (born Syed Ali Naqi Zaidi) (1862-1950), an Urdu poet

See also
 Zaidi (surname)